is a Japanese racing driver who most recently competed in the 2022 W Series. She is the daughter of former Formula 1 driver Hideki Noda.

Early and personal life 
Juju Noda was born on 2 February 2006. She is the daughter of former Formula One driver Hideki Noda, and began karting at the age of 3.

In 2018, Noda was featured in a micro-documentary created by Great Big Story.

Career

Early career 
Noda tested single-seater race cars on Japanese circuits from the age of 9. She made her official competition car debut in the 2019 Lucas Oil Winter Race Series, where she finished 14th overall.

F4 Danish Championship 
Noda made her debut in the Formula 4 category in 2020, racing in the F4 Danish Championship with her family team, Noda Racing. She won her first ever race in the series, and finished 6th in the standings.

She continued in the championship in 2021, after a last minute switch from the F4 United States Championship. She finished 7th in the standings this year.

F4 United States Championship 
In January 2021, it was announced that Noda would race for Jay Howard Driver Development in the 2021 Formula 4 United States Championship. 

She was fastest in the practice session in Round 1 at Road Atlanta, however she then withdrew prior to qualifying. She did not appear at any more rounds.

W Series 
Noda appeared at the second pre-season test on 2–4 March 2022 at Barcelona, the only driver to do so who was not an automatic qualifier or who had attended the first test in Arizona, one month prior. The full W Series grid was announced on 22 March 2022, with Noda included. She would go on to score two points throughout the season, finishing fourteenth in the championship.

Racing record

Racing career summary 

† As Noda was a guest driver, she was ineligible to score points.
* Season still in progress.

Complete F4 Danish Championship results 
(key) (Races in bold indicate pole position) (Races in italics indicate fastest lap)

Complete W Series results
(key) (Races in bold indicate pole position) (Races in italics indicate fastest lap)

References

External links 
 Official website
 
 Profile at W Series

Living people
2006 births
W Series drivers
Japanese female racing drivers
Austrian Formula Three Championship drivers
United States F4 Championship drivers
Danish F4 Championship drivers